The United States Ambassador to China is the chief United States diplomat to the People's Republic of China. The United States has sent diplomatic representatives to China since 1844, when Caleb Cushing, as commissioner, negotiated the Treaty of Wanghia. Commissioners represented the United States in China from 1844 to 1857. Until 1898, China did not have a system in place for the Emperor to accept the Letters of Credence of foreign representatives. From 1858 to 1935, the United States representative in China was formally Envoy Extraordinary and Minister Plenipotentiary to China. The American legation in Nanjing was upgraded to an embassy in 1935 and the Envoy was promoted to Ambassador Extraordinary and Plenipotentiary.

During the republican era, the United States recognized the Beiyang Government in Beijing from 1912 to 1928 and the Nationalist Government in Nanjing (and Chongqing from 1937 to 1945) from 1928 onwards. After the Communist Party established the People's Republic of China in mainland China in 1949 and the Kuomintang moved the Republic of China government from Nanjing to Taipei of Taiwan, the United States continued to recognize the Republic of China as the legitimate Chinese government and maintained its embassy in Taiwan. However, in 1973, the United States established a Liaison Office in Beijing to represent its interests in mainland China. In 1976, the Chief of the Liaison Office was promoted to the rank of ambassador. In December 1978, the United States severed official relations with the Republic of China and in January 1979, established formal relations with the People's Republic of China. The United States Liaison Office in Beijing was upgraded to an embassy on March 1, 1979. The American Institute in Taiwan was established in 1979 to serve as the unofficial United States representative to Taiwan, with the director of its Taipei Office taking the role of a de facto ambassador.

Chronology
Representation is as follows (years refer to dates of actual service):

Qing Empire:
Commissioner to the Great Qing: 1843 to 1857
Envoy Extraordinary and Minister Plenipotentiary: 1858 to 1912
Republic of China:
Envoy Extraordinary and Minister Plenipotentiary to the Republic of China: 1913 to 1935
Ambassador Extraordinary and Plenipotentiary to the Republic of China: 1935 to 1979
Director of the Taipei Office of the American Institute in Taiwan: 1979 to present
People's Republic of China:
Chief of the United States Liaison Office in the People's Republic of China: 1973 to 1979
Ambassador Extraordinary and Plenipotentiary to the People's Republic of China: since 1979

List of envoys to the Qing Empire

List of envoys to the Republic of China

List of ambassadors to the Republic of China

The Communists took the Nationalist capital of Nanjing in April 1949, but Stuart was not recalled from China until August 1949. The United States did not recognize the new government of the People's Republic of China upon its founding in October 1949. The Consulate in Taipei was upgraded to an embassy in 1953, and therefore the Ambassador to China maintained residence at Taipei, Taiwan, in the Republic of China until relations were severed in 1979. (See: Former American Consulate in Taipei)

For a list of de facto United States ambassadors to Republic of China since 1979, see list of Directors of the American Institute in Taiwan.

List of chiefs of the United States Liaison Office in Beijing 
Between May 1973 and March 1979 prior to the official establishment of diplomatic relations, the United States dispatched a head of United States Liaison Office in Beijing.

List of ambassadors to the People's Republic of China
The United States established diplomatic relations with the People's Republic of China, and terminated them with the Republic of China, on January 1, 1979. The American Embassy at Taipei closed February 28, 1979, while the American Liaison Office at Beijing was redesignated the American Embassy on March 1, 1979.

See also
Embassy of the United States, Beijing
China – United States relations
Foreign relations of China
Ambassadors of the United States
Americans in China

Notes

References

Citations

Sources 

 United States Department of State: Background notes on China

External links
United States Department of State: Chiefs of Mission for China
United States Department of State: China
United States Embassy in Beijing

 
China
Ambassador
United States